Kina′u Boyd Kamali′i (October 24, 1930 – October 28, 2005) was an American politician from the state of Hawaii.

Kamali′i served as administrator of the Hawaii State Health and Planning Agency. She was also a trustee in the Office of Hawaiian Affairs from 1992 to 1996 and was chairwoman of the Native Hawaiian Study Commission from 1981 to 1983. From 1974 to 1982 and from 1984 to 1986, Kamali′I served in the Hawaii House of Representatives and was involved with the Republican Party.

Notes

External links

1930 births
2005 deaths
Women state legislators in Hawaii
Republican Party members of the Hawaii House of Representatives
Native Hawaiian politicians
Native Hawaiian women in politics
20th-century American politicians
20th-century American women politicians
21st-century American women